Ernest Sinclair "Tuppy" Diack (born 22 July 1930) is a former New Zealand rugby union player. A wing three-quarter, Diack represented Otago and, briefly, Southland at a provincial level. He played one match for the New Zealand national side, the All Blacks, namely the second test against the touring 1959 British Lions.

References

1935 births
Living people
Rugby union players from Invercargill
People educated at Gore High School
University of Otago alumni
New Zealand rugby union players
New Zealand international rugby union players
Otago rugby union players
Southland rugby union players
Rugby union wings